Ángel Israel Mena Delgado (born 21 January 1988) is an Ecuadorian professional footballer who plays as a winger for Liga MX club León and the Ecuador national team.

Club career

Emelec
Mena had extended his contract until 2017 with Club Sport Emelec. He played in 129 games for the national championship and scored 25 goals, according to records of the Ecuadorian Football Federation (FEF).

He debuted in the first division in 2007. He scored his first official goal on 16 March 2008 at the Técnico Universitario.

In 2010, he was loaned to Deportivo Cuenca. In 2011, he returns to Club Sport Emelec, and was champion in 2013 and 2014.

After scoring 14 goals as Emelec won the 2014 championship, Mena extended his contract with the club for two years in February 2015. Mena scored the first goal in the 2014 Ecuadorian Serie A season final match against Barcelona SC, winning 3–0.

Cruz Azul
In 2017 Mena joined Mexican side Cruz Azul. On 12 February Mena scored an impressive free-kick goal against Santos Laguna which earned Cruz Azul a 2–2 draw.

International career
In April 2014, being in Emelec, Mena was first called up to the Ecuador national football team, led by coach Reinaldo Rueda, for a microcycle. Mena was called for Ecuador's provisional 30-man squad for World Cup 2014 in Brazil.

Later in 2014, the interim coach of the Ecuador national team, Sixto Vizuete called up Mena to play friendly matches against Bolivia and Brazil. However, Mena suffered an injury that prevented him playing with the national team.

Mena made his debut on 28 March 2015 in a match against Mexico, coming in as a sub for Jefferson Montero.

Career statistics

Club

International

Scores and results list Ecuador's goal tally first, score column indicates score after each Mena goal.

Honours
Emelec
Serie A: 2013, 2014, 2015, 2016

Cruz Azul
Copa MX: Apertura 2018

León
Liga MX: Guardianes 2020
 Leagues Cup: 2021

Individual
Serie A Assist Leader: 2014
Liga MX Golden Boot: Clausura 2019
Liga MX Offensive Midfielder of the Year: 2018–19
Liga MX Best XI: Clausura 2019, Guardianes 2020, Apertura 2021
Liga MX All-Star: 2021

Personal life
Mena is married to Shirley Posligua with whom he has two daughters. He and his family are devout Christians. Mena is good friends with fellow footballer Joao Rojas with whom he shared a locker while at Emelec, the fact that Rojas played for Cruz Azul was a significant factor in motivating Mena to join the club.

References

External links
 
 
 

1988 births
Living people
Sportspeople from Guayaquil
Association football wingers
Ecuadorian footballers
Ecuador international footballers
C.S. Emelec footballers
C.D. Cuenca footballers
Copa América Centenario players
2019 Copa América players
2021 Copa América players
Cruz Azul footballers
Club León footballers
Ecuadorian Serie A players
Liga MX players
Ecuadorian expatriate footballers
Expatriate footballers in Mexico
Ecuadorian expatriate sportspeople in Mexico
Ecuadorian Christians
2022 FIFA World Cup players